The misery index is an economic indicator, created by economist Arthur Okun. The index helps determine how the average citizen is doing economically and is calculated by adding the seasonally adjusted unemployment rate to the annual inflation rate. It is assumed that both a higher rate of unemployment and a worsening of inflation create economic and social costs for a country.

Misery index by US presidential administration

Variations
Harvard Economist Robert Barro created what he dubbed the "Barro Misery Index" (BMI), in 1999. The BMI takes the sum of the inflation and unemployment rates, and adds to that the interest rate, plus (minus) the shortfall (surplus) between the actual and trend rate of GDP growth.

In the late 2000s, Johns Hopkins economist Steve Hanke built upon Barro's misery index and began applying it to countries beyond the United States. His modified misery index is the sum of the interest, inflation, and unemployment rates, minus the year-over-year percent change in per-capita GDP growth.

Hanke has recently constructed a World Table of Misery Index Scores by exclusively relying on data reported by the Economist Intelligence Unit. This table includes a list of 89 countries, ranked from worst to best, with data as of December 31, 2013 (see table below).

Political economists Jonathan Nitzan and Shimshon Bichler found a negative correlation between a similar "stagflation index" and corporate amalgamation (i.e. mergers and acquisitions) in the United States since the 1930s. In their theory, stagflation is a form of political economic sabotage employed by corporations to achieve differential accumulation, in this case as an alternative to amalgamation when merger and acquisition opportunities have run out.

Hanke's 2020 Misery Index

Criticism
A 2001 paper looking at large-scale surveys in Europe and the United States concluded that unemployment more heavily influences unhappiness than inflation. This implies that the basic misery index underweights the unhappiness attributable to the unemployment rate: "the estimates suggest that people would trade off a 1-percentage-point increase in the employment rate for a 1.7-percentage-point increase in the inflation rate."

Misery and crime
Some economists posit that the components of the Misery Index drive the crime rate to a degree.  Using data from 1960 to 2005, they have found that the Misery Index and the crime rate correlate strongly and that the Misery Index seems to lead the crime rate by a year or so. In fact, the correlation is so strong that the two can be said to be cointegrated, and stronger than correlation with either the unemployment rate or inflation rate alone.

Data sources
The data for the misery index is obtained from unemployment data published by the U.S. Department of Labor (U3) and the Inflation Rate (CPI-U) from the Bureau of Labor Statistics.  The exact methods used for measuring unemployment and inflation have changed over time, although past data is usually normalized so that past and future metrics are comparable.

See also
Elder Index

References

External links
 The current and historical Misery Index
 The Misery Index by President
 The Misery Index By Year
 Cato Publications Commentary
 Correlations of Misery Index and Consumer Sentiment

Political science theories
Economic indicators
Unemployment
Inflation